Mohammad Nabi Habibi (19 December 1945 – 29 January 2019) was an Iranian politician and sociologist who was Secretary-General of the Islamic Coalition Party from 2004 until his death in 2019. He was Mayor of Tehran from 1983 until 1987, for a span lasting 44 months.

Political career
Habibi was a part of the opposition movements during the Pahvali era and Shah of Iran and was jailed before the Islamic Revolution 1979. After the revolution he gained strong political profile and was appointed to key positions including:

 Governor of Tehran province
 Governor of greater Khorasan province
 Deputy of Minister of Transportation
 The head of Iran Civil Aviation Organization
 The head of Iran Post

References

1946 births
2019 deaths
Islamic Coalition Party politicians
University of Tehran alumni
People from Tehran
Iranian revolutionaries
People of the Iranian Revolution
Popular Front of Islamic Revolution Forces politicians
Secretaries-General of political parties in Iran
People from Varamin